Miller's Landing Park is a  park in Bend, Oregon, in the United States. It features river access and part of the Deschutes River Trail.

References

Parks in Bend, Oregon